Everything You've Come to Expect is the second album by English supergroup The Last Shadow Puppets, released on 1 April 2016 by Domino Recording Company. It was written by band co-frontmen Alex Turner and Miles Kane in 2014 between London, Paris and Los Angeles. It was produced in Malibu by fellow member James Ford, alongside guest musician Matt Helders, and new bass player, Zach Dawes. Featuring once again string arrangements by Owen Pallett. The album artwork features a photo of singer Tina Turner dancing, as photographed by Jack Robinson in November 1969, the original picture was modified by illustrator Matthew Cooper, who gave it a gold tint.

Everything You've Come to Expect exchanges the understated sound of the first record for a more maximalist production. It features a wide array of genres that include baroque pop, blue-eyed soul, and psychedelic pop. It also draws influence from desert rock, post-punk and Italian film scores. Its lyrical content explores themes of hedonism, romance, and self doubt.

Following its release, the album was promoted by the singles "Bad Habits" and "Aviation", as well as a global tour and multiple television appearances.

Background and recording
The band's first album The Age of the Understatement was released eight years prior, in 2008, to critical acclaim. Since then, Turner had released three albums with Arctic Monkeys, Humbug (2009), Suck It and See (2011),  and AM (2013), as well as composing the acoustic soundtrack for the feature film Submarine (2010) Meanwhile, Kane had released his first two albums as a solo artist, Colour of the Trap (2011) and Don't Forget Who You Are (2013).

Following the release of Kane's sophomore record, him and Turner were on the process of writing, what at the time, was thought to be Kane's next album. During one of those writing sessions, both "experimented with a vocal harmony" on a 8-track demo, which would later become "Aviation", this reminded them of their work on The Age of the Understament, but also they felt it was, "promising, in that it suggested there was somewhere to go with it as well." The album was written on acoustic guitar and on a Vox Continental keyboard, between Kane's apartment in London, Paris, and Los Angeles. Most of the songs did not make the album, except for "Pattern", which they said was "the oldest song in the album", in contrast with "Everything You've Come to Expect", which was the last thing written for the record. They contacted fellow member James Ford, and played him the demos, who agreed to join them.

In the summer of 2015, The Last Shadow Puppets began recording material at Rick Rubin's Shangri La Studios in Malibu, California, their first choice was La Fabrique Studios in Saint-Rémy-de-Provence, France, but it was already booked. Core member and drummer James Ford produced the album. The album features string arrangements from frequent collaborator Owen Pallett, originally the plan was for Pallett to go to the studio for two days, and then work independently from the band, but he ended up staying in the studio until the end of the sessions. Turner said Pallett helped in making the songs feel more cohesive, as he thought before he came in, "the recordings were a bit all over the place". The band was also joined for the first time by Zach Dawes from Mini Mansions, on bass. Dawes later continued as a member during their live performances. The album was recorded in three weeks, with all members in "one room", which Turner claims he had not done since Suck It See. The string parts were written on piano and later done separately in Hollywood studio United Recording. Turner recalled the sessions, felt like "a holiday" similarly to the ones for the first album, Pallett agreed and thought they were more "like hanging out with mates than work". When not in the studio the band would spend their time swimming, going to a nearby karaoke bar, and to a sports bar.

Composition

Musical style and influences

The album has been compared to the works of Jean-Claude Vannier, Serge Gainsbourg, Isaac Hayes, The Replacements, Lou Reed, Beck, and Scott Walker,.

In an interview with NME, the Last Shadow Puppets stated that their songwriting was influenced by Isaac Hayes and The Style Council, as opposed to the Scott Walker influences of their first album. Turner cited David Bowie as being "sort of in the DNA of every record, to some extent. He’s been built-in for a long time", and Serge Gainsbourg, "I always just keep trying to make everything sound like Melody Nelson and getting nowhere near." The band also mentioned, Sparks, Dr. Hook's When You're in Love with a Beautiful Woman, and Ned Doheny's "Get It Up for Love" as inspiration, as well as, Tears For Fears, Depeche Mode, and The Prodigy as bands they were listening to at the time. Turner further cited the bass line to Sonic's Rendezvous Band’s "City Slang" as a heavy inspiration for "Bad Habits".

Lyrics and themes
Lyrically, the album main themes are hedonism, romance, and self doubt.  With the songs alluding to: Sex and free love, recreational drug use, prostitution, jealousy, dreams, and homoerotic imagery. The album setting revolves around Los Angeles and the West Coast, and includes references to the neighbourhood of Los Feliz, and cities outside the United States, such as Sheffield, and Paris. Turner thought the lyrics on this record were "more effective and more refined", than the ones on their debut, and that they had achieved something "slightly more surreal or abstract".

Songs
"Aviation", the album's opening track, begins with an "echoing scrape of strings". Its first verse references sectoral heterochromia, an eye condition in which part of one iris is a different color from its remainder. Its second verse uses the term "coke-head close" to describe a woman, under the influence of the drug, loudly talking to the narrator. Turner wanted to use the word "Colorama" in a song since the first time he saw Michelangelo Antonioni's Blow-Up (1966), he described it as, "an unplugged neon light at the back of my mind for years", about the line he added,  "It doesn’t make a ton of sense, but that’s not really the point. "I think, not always, but sometimes it’s good to just have the lyrics facilitate a melody, like, that’s harder to do, [...] — getting the fuckin’ ‘I Am The Walrus’ shit right." Musically, the track's been described as coming closest to the "Lee Hazlewood-indebted style" of their first record.

On "Miracle Aligner" the album its at its most "lush" and "seductive". The song has a "breezy melody", and makes use of "tremolo-heavy guitars". The duo jokingly claimed the song was inspired by a "yoga teacher" and a "make-believe wrestler." Turner has said the beginnings of the song are "really old", with the song being mostly written by himself and musician Alexandra Savior. Originally written for her debut album, "it ended up being under the Shadow Puppets umbrella." Savior rejected the song, saying, "is obviously about a coke dealer - it's a lifestyle that I didn't relate to myself." Musically it has been described as "honeyed soul-pop".

"Everything You've Come to Expect" is a "psychedelic waltz" and has been called "Beatle-esque". The song finds Turner as "a jealous guy", among a "phantasmagoria of surreal visions of decadence".  The song references several songs and musicians, with the line "Croc-skin collar on a diamond dog" recalling David Bowie's album of the same name. The mention of Honey Pie on the preceding verse, was thought to be a Beatles reference, although Turner admitted it was coincidental. The band has said it was the last song written for the album, and "the further down the wing" they have gone in terms of songwriting, adding that its their favourite track in the record. "The Element of Surprise" has been called a ballad "direct from a past era" that finds producer James Ford "steering closer to his dance music origins". "Bad Habits" has been described as a "sinister punk mariachi groover" driven by "Pallett’s violins", with "Iggy Pop-like intensity".  The song started with Turner playing the bass line, inspired by the one in Sonic's Rendezvous Band’s "City Slang". The stream of consciousness lyrics were edited down from the original 40 minute long take, where Kane started reciting words without repeating himself once. Kane highlighted Ford's work in the song "to make it a pop song with, like, a punky edge".

On "Sweet Dreams, TN", Turner "approximates a Nashville crooner" and has an "Elvis-in Vegas-turn" in what has been described as a "career best vocal". Its has a "bolero-like staccato rhythm and slapback echo-drenched vocal". It started when Turner sat down "playing an old Roy Orbison riff on an acoustic". The track is a love song for his at the time girlfriend, Taylor Bagley, and the most direct piece of writing in the record, "That tune actually is perhaps the only one where i sat down and it is just what it is, That's straightforward that", Turner has said. Bagley convinced him to put the song on the record as he at first thought "There was almost too much truth in it or something." It has been described as "country-tinged" and "lounge singer grandeur".

"Used to Be My Girl" is a "Homme-tinged desert rider", with lyrics that evoke a "quasi comic self loathing". "She Does the Woods" is punctuacted by "high-drama stabs". Turner said the track improved after Owen Pallet's arrangements were added, and was direct about the lyrics, "Its pretty obvious that its about shagging in the woods". Both tracks are a "double bill of [...] moodier tunes" and due to their placement on the album have been said to "evoke the sense it's one epic track", both likened to a mix of previous Arctic Monkeys' works, "Suck It and See infused with the darker rhythms of Humbug". "Pattern" is a orchestral pop track with "Isaac Hayes influenced" strings, that give it "a soulful swagger". Lyrically being a "the-morning-after-several-nights-in-a-row-before lament".

The album's final track, "The Dream Synopsis", finds Turner at his most "lugubrious and lizardy". As the title describes, in the song he  recounts his dreams to another person. He said of the track "It's almost like when you do talk about your dreams to someone, it's always the fucking most boring [...] And I thought, perhaps, if you added a melody and surrounded it by music, maybe it's more compelling. Marginally more compelling." The first verse references Turner's time as a part-time bartender at The Boardwalk during the early years of his career. The line "And a wicked gale came howling up through Sheffield City Centre There was palm tree debris everywhere" was an attempt to connect his native Sheffield with his, at the time, residence of Los Angeles. It further references the neighbourhood of Los Feliz, and bandmate Miles Kane. Turner claimed "It's a love song, after all. For a girl." "The Bourne Identity" is a "violin-heavy hero's lament", which stands as the last track on the deluxe version of the album. The song "comes back to imposter syndrome". Both closers have had its sound compared to "vintage Lennon, Bowie and Lou Reed" with "The Bourne Identity" further feeling "like a direct continuation of Turner's serene Submarine".

Artwork and title
The album art consists of a photo of singer Tina Turner dancing, as photographed by Jack Robinson in November 1969 in New York City. Alex Turner had a réplica of the photograph, which was gifted to him by a friend, hanging in his kitchen for many years. Both him and Kane chose the image, as they thought that it would make a great album cover. After the record was done they got in touch with Tina Turner's team and she agreed. Illustrator Matthew Cooper modified the original image and gave it a gold tint. 
Cooper told the BBC:
"The idea was to move the artwork on from the ’60s feel of the first Last Shadow Puppets album artwork, so here is Tina on the very cusp of the 1970s". The record cover beat Blackstar by David Bowie to win the prize for best album artwork 2016. The prize was organised by Art Vinyl.

The title comes from the track of the same name, as the band thought it was the "centerpiece" of the record. Turner has also described it as "sort of a joke" because the band has only one other album, so there would not be that much to be expectant about. He also thought the string arrangements made the project inherently "sophisticated and elegant", which  reflected in the title in "an amusing way", comparing it to a cognac advertisement.

Release and promotion
After speculation about work on the album sparked by a tweet from arranger Owen Pallett, album producer James Ford stated in November 2015 that the album had been finished. The release of Everything You've Come to Expect was first announced on 3 December 2015, through a short video directed by Ben Chappell. The video depicted Turner walking through the studio towards the recording booth, interpersed with other shots of the band. Another teaser was released on 28 December, and included snippets of new music. On 21 January, the band announced their album would be released on 1 April, and explained it to be the second installment in a trilogy of albums to be released by them.

Singles and videos
The lead single, "Bad Habits", was released on 10 January 2016 alongside a music video directed by Ben Chapell. The video depicts Kane and Turner at a dive bar in California, where they performed the song live, interspersed with footage of them socialising and womanising.

The next three singles, the title track, "Aviation" and "Miracle Aligner" were released as a video trilogy entitled, "The Italian Saga", directed by Saam Farahmand. It has been described as "A tale of mob, love and music in stunning Italian 60s cinemascope". Although, "Everything You've Come to Expect" was first released on March 10, it serves as the second installment of the trilogy, with "Aviation", released six days later, being the first. The first two videos were described as "an intriguing Tarantino-esque two-parter, entirely set on a deserted Californian beach." The last installment, "Miracle Aligner", was released on 28 March 2016.

Tour
In January 2016, the band announced a tour of Europe and the U.S. which began that March, In February they extended the tour into July, with dates added in the United Kingdom, Ireland, Italy, Mexico, and Japan. On 24 March, they played live in Cambridge. This was the tour's opening performance, and the Last Shadow Puppets first performance since 2010. In March and April they announced dates in Germany and England, and in May they announced their U.S. tour. During the tour they were supported by Jeff Wootton, Yak, Cam Avery and Alexandra Savior.

The band also headlined several music festivals, including Coachella, Radio 1's Big Weekend, Primavera Sound, Rockwave, T in the Park, and Lollapalooza in Chicago. In June 2016, the band performed on the pyramid stage at Glastonbury. During the set, they performed a cover of "Moonage Daydream" in memory of David Bowie. On July, the band played two nights at Alexandra Palace in London, on the second date, they were joined by Johnny Marr for a cover of The Smiths' "Last Night I Dreamt That Somebody Loved Me."  They ended their 2016 tour on 26 August by playing at the Rock en Seine festival in Paris, France. The group were joined by touring members Davey Latter, Loren Humphrey, Tyler Parkford, and string section members, Caroline Buckman, Claudia Chopek, Jennifer Takamatsu and Mikala Schmitz.

Other performances
The band made a number of television performances in promotion of the album including on the late-night talk shows Le Grand Journal, Late Night with Seth Meyers, The Late Late Show with James Corden, and Later...with Jools Holland. On March, they played an acoustic set at VOX Studios in Los Angeles, and a week later, an intimate show at Club 69 for Studio Brussel, where they played the album in full, as well as five tracks from their debut. Several live sessions were recorded for radio stations such as Sirius XM, Flux FM, and BBC Radio 2. Another acoustic session was recorded for Spotify at their studios in London.

Critical reception

Everything You've Come to Expect received positive reviews from contemporary music critics. At Metacritic, which assigns a normalised rating out of 100 to reviews from mainstream critics, the album received an average score of 70, based on 28 reviews, which indicates "generally favorable reviews".

In a positive review, The Independent noted the album's experimental nature, and wrote that the album "improves over time." Philip Cosores of  Consequence said "The album is never tortuous or boring", and felt its quality was on par with the band members' principal works, as they all devoted themselves to the record. He also thought the album "feels necessary within the context of all their careers".

Writing for The Guardian,  Alexis Petridis, thought the album was less musically focused than their first record, but also, "less inclined to lapse into straightforward pastiche." He wasn't that complimentary to the lyrics either, saying, "You can detect something a bit distasteful in their worldview: an arrogance and entitlement that all that clever wordplay can’t quite cover."

Accolades

Track listing

Personnel

Credits adapted from album liner notes.

The Last Shadow Puppets
 Alex Turner – vocals, guitars, keyboards, percussion
 Miles Kane – vocals, guitars, saxophone
 James Ford – drums, percussion, keyboards
 Zachary Dawes – bass guitar, percussion, guitar, keyboards

Additional musicians
 Matt Helders – backing vocals 

Production
 James Ford – production
 Sean Oakley – engineering
 Ross Hogarth – orchestra recording 
 Tchad Blake – mixing
 Brian Lucey – mastering

Artwork
 Matthew Cooper – design
 Jack Robinson – cover photography
 Zackery Michael – booklet photography
 Matt Helders – booklet photography
 Ben Chappell – booklet photography
 Taylor Bagley – booklet photography

Orchestrations
 Owen Pallett – arrangement, conducting
 Eric Gorfrain – violin
 Marisa Kuney – violin
 Amy Wickman – violin
 Daphne Chen – violin
 Gina Kronstadt – violin
 Alwyn Wright – violin
 Chris Woods – violin
 Leah Katz – violin
 Rodney Wirtz – viola
 Richard Dodd – cello
 John Krovoza – cello
 Peggy Baldwin – cello
 Ian Walker – contrabass
 Chris Bautista – violin
 Stephanie O'Keefe – French horn
 Sara Andon – flute
 Nick Daley – violin

Charts

Weekly charts

Year-end charts

Certifications

References

2016 albums
Albums produced by James Ford (musician)
Albums recorded at Shangri-La (recording studio)
Domino Recording Company albums
The Last Shadow Puppets albums